Triangle is a fraternity for male students majoring in engineering, architecture, and the physical, mathematical, biological, and computer sciences. It is the only member of the North American Interfraternity Conference to limit its membership recruitment to these majors.

Triangle Fraternity organized at the University of Illinois at Urbana–Champaign in the fall of 1906 and was incorporated by the state of Illinois on 15 April 1907, which is celebrated each year as Founders' Day.

As of February 2020 there are 39 chapters and six colonies of Triangle Fraternity active in the U.S. The headquarters is located in Plainfield, Indiana in a historic building erected as a Carnegie library in 1912.

Triangle Fraternity is one of three active national fraternities not to use Greek letters for its name, the others being Acacia and FarmHouse.

History

Triangle was formed in the fall of 1906 by sixteen civil engineering juniors at the University of Illinois. It was formally incorporated on 15 April 1907. The date of incorporation has been designated as Founders' Day, and Triangle celebrates it every year at each chapter.

Triangle's mission statement reads, "The purpose of Triangle shall be to maintain a fraternity of engineers, architects and scientists.  It shall carry out its purpose by establishing chapters that develop balanced men who cultivate high moral character, foster lifelong friendships, and live their lives with integrity."

Symbols
 Colors: Old Rose and Gray
 Coat of Arms: The crest consists of a rising sun beneath a Triangle T. Beneath is an esquire helmet in profile. At the center of the Coat of Arms is the fraternity's shield and a ribbon containing the organization's motto "Veritas Omnia Vincit" (Truth Conquers All). Surrounding the shield is a mantling.
 Flower: White Chrysanthemum
 Flag: The Coat of Arms on a Yellow T with Gray field.

Code of Ethics
Triangle Fraternity was founded on high ethical and moral ideals, and expects the men of the fraternity to follow a set Code of Ethics, which is as follows:

As a member of Triangle, I recognize my obligation to:

 Observe the precepts of the Fraternity as set forth in the Ritual;
 Accept cheerfully my full share of any task, however menial, involved in maintaining a chapter home;
 Preserve and promote the chosen ideals of my Fraternity;
 Pay all personal bills promptly, and always live within my means;
 Help create in my chapter home an environment in which enduring friendships may be formed;
 Maintain a creditable scholastic record;
 Promote the welfare of my profession;
 Maintain my self-respect by proper conduct at all times;
 Uphold faithfully the traditions and program of my Alma Mater;
 Pay the price of success in honest effort.

Notable alumni

Chapter list

See also
 List of social fraternities and sororities
 Professional fraternities and sororities

References

External links
 Triangle Education Foundation

 
Student organizations established in 1907
North American Interfraternity Conference
1907 establishments in Illinois